

I

 

Ianbruceite (IMA2011-049) 8.DA.50  [no] [no]
Iangreyite (IMA2009-087) 8.DE.45  [no] 
Ianthinite (Y: 1926) 4.GA.10    (IUPAC: diuranium(IV) tetrauranyl tetrahydro hexaoxide nonahydrate)
Ice (Ice Ih) (Y: old) 4.AA.05   
Ice-VII (IMA2017-029) 4.AA.  [no] [no]
Ichnusaite (IMA2013-087) 7.0  [no] [no] (IUPAC: thorium dimolybdate trihydrate)
Icosahedrite (quasicrystal: IMA2010-042) 1.0  [no] [no]
Idaite (stannnite: 1959) 2.CB.15a    (IUPAC: tricopper iron tetrasulfide)
Idrialite (Y: 1832) 10.BA.20   
Igelströmite (IMA2021-035) 4.BC.  [no] [no]
Iimoriite-(Y) (IMA1967-033) 9.AH.05    (IUPAC: diyttrium tetraoxosilicate carbonate)
Ikaite (IMA1962-005) 5.CB.25    (IUPAC: calcium carbonate hexahydrate)
Ikranite (eudialyte: IMA2000-010) 9.CO.10   [no]
Ikunolite (tetradymite: IMA1962 s.p., 1959) 2.DC.05    (IUPAC: tetrabismuth trisulfide)
Ilesite (starkeyite: 1881) 7.CB.15    (IUPAC: manganese(II) sulfate tetrahydrate)
Ilímaussite-(Ce) (IMA1965-025) 9.CB.15   
Ilinskite (selenite: IMA1996-027) 4.JG.20    (IUPAC: sodium pentacopper trichloro dioxodiselenite)
Ilirneyite (zemannite: IMA2015-046) 4.0  [no] [no]
(Illite, mica series)
Illoqite-(Ce) (nordite: IMA2021-021) 9.DO.  [no] [no]
Ilmajokite-(Ce) (IMA1971-027) 9.HB.05   
Ilmenite (corundum: 1827) 4.CB.05    (IUPAC: iron(II) titanium(IV) trioxide)
IlsemanniteQ (Y: 1871) 4.FJ.15   
Iltisite (IMA1994-031) 2.FC.20b   [no] (IUPAC: mercury silver chloro sulfide)
Ilvaite (Y: 1811) 9.BE.07    (IUPAC: calcium iron(II) diron(III) oxoheptaoxodisilicate hydroxyl)
Ilyukhinite (eudialyte: IMA2015-065) 9.C?.  [no] [no]
Imandrite (lovozerite: IMA1979-025) 9.CJ.15b   
Imayoshiite (ettringite: IMA2013-069) 6.0  [no] [no] (IUPAC: tricalcium aluminium carbonate hexahydro [tetrahydroborate] dodecahydrate)
Imhofite (IMA1971 s.p., 1965) 2.HD.30    (Tl5.8As15.4S26)
Imiterite (IMA1983-038) 2.BD.05    (IUPAC: disilver mercury disulfide)
Imogolite (allophane: IMA1987 s.p., 1962 Rd) 9.ED.20    (IUPAC: dialuminium trioxosilicate tetrahydroxyl)
Inaglyite (IMA1983-054) 2.DA.20    (IUPAC: lead tricopper octairidium hexadecasulfide)
Incomsartorite (sartorite: IMA2016-035) 2.0  [no] [no]
Inderborite (Y: 1941) 06.CA.25   
Inderite (IMA1962 s.p., 1937) 6.CA.15    (IUPAC: magnesium pentahydro trioxotriborate pentahydrate) 
Indialite (beryl: 1954) 9.CJ.05    (IUPAC: dimagnesium trialuminium (aluminopentasilicate) octadecaoxy)
Indigirite (IMA1971-012) 5.DA.10    (IUPAC: dimagnesium dialuminium dihydro tetracarbonate pentadecahydrate)
Indite (spinel, linnaeite: IMA1967 s.p., 1963) 2.DA.05    (IUPAC: iron diindium tetrasulfide)
Indium (element: IMA1968 s.p., 1964) 1.AC.05   
Inesite (Y: 1887) 9.DL.05   
Ingersonite (IMA1986-021) 4.DH.40    (IUPAC: tricalcium manganese(II) tetraantimony(V) tetradecaoxide)
Ingodite (tetradymite: IMA1980-045) 2.DC.05    (IUPAC: dibismuth telluride sulfide)
Innelite (seidozerite, lamprophyllite: IMA1962 s.p.) 9.BE.40   
Innsbruckite (IMA2013-038) 9.0  [no] [no]
Insizwaite (pyrite: IMA1971-031) 2.EB.05a    (IUPAC: platinum dibismuthide)
Intersilite (IMA1995-033) 9.EE.60   [no]
Inyoite (Y: 1914) 6.CA.35    (IUPAC: calcium pentahydro trioxotriborate tetrahydrate)
Iodargyrite (wurtzite: IMA1962 s.p., 1825) 3.AA.10    (IUPAC: silver iodide)
Iowaite (hydrotalcite: IMA1967-002) 4.FL.05    (IUPAC: hexamagnesium diiron(III) dichloro hexadecahydroxide dihydrate)
Iquiqueite (IMA1984-019) 6.H0.20   
Iranite (iranite: IMA1980 s.p., 1963) 7.FC.15   
Iraqite-(La) (steacyite: IMA1973-041) 9.CH.10   
Irarsite (pyrite: IMA1966-028) 2.EB.25    (IUPAC: iridium sulfarsenide)
Irhtemite (IMA1971-034) 8.CB.55   
Iridarsenite (IMA1973-021) 2.AC.45b    (IUPAC: iridium diarsenide)
Iridium (element: IMA1991 s.p., 1804 Rd) 1.AF.10   
Iriginite (Y: 1957) 4.GB.60    (IUPAC: uranyl dimolybdenum(VI) heptaoxide trihydrate)
Irinarassite (garnet: IMA2010-073) 9.A?.  [no] [no]
Iron (iron: old) 1.AE.05   
Irtyshite (IMA1984-025) 4.DJ.05    (IUPAC: disodium tetratantalum undecaoxide)
Iseite (nolanite: IMA2012-020) 4.CB.40  [no]  (IUPAC: dimanganese trimolybdenum octaoxide)
Ishiharaite (sphalerite: IMA2013-119) 2.0  [no] [no]
Ishikawaite (Y: 1922) 4.DB.25   
IsoclasiteQ (Y: 1870) 8.DN.10  [no] [no] (IUPAC: dicalcium hydro phosphate dihydrate)
Isocubanite (sphalerite: IMA1983-E) 2.CB.55b    (IUPAC: copper diiron trisulfide)
Isoferroplatinum (auricupride: IMA1974-012a) 1.AG.35    (IUPAC: triplatinum iron alloy)
Isokite (titanite: 1955) 8.BH.10    (IUPAC: calcium magnesium fluoro phosphate)
Isolueshite (oxide perovskite: IMA1995-024) 4.CC.35    (IUPAC: sodium niobium trioxide)
Isomertieite (IMA1973-057) 2.AC.15a    (IUPAC: undecapalladium diantimonide diarsenide)
Isovite (carbide: IMA1996-039) 1.BA.10   [no] (IUPAC: tricosa(chromium,iron) hexacarbide)
Isselite (IMA2018-139) 7.0  [no] [no]
Itelmenite (IMA2015-047) 7.0  [no] [no] (IUPAC: tetrasodium trimagnesium tricopper octasulfate)
Itoigawaite (lawsonite: IMA1998-034) 9.BE.05   [no]
Itoite (IMA1962 s.p.) 7.BD.50    (IUPAC: trilead germanium dihydro dioxodisulfate)
Itsiite (hyalotekite: IMA2013-085) 9.0  [no]  (IUPAC: dibarium calcium di(boroheptaoxodisilicate))
Ivanyukite series 9.0 [Ti4O2(OH)2(SiO4)3], pharmacosiderite structural group
Ivanyukite-Cu (IMA2007-043) 9.0   [no]
Ivanyukite-K (IMA2007-042) 9.0   [no]
Ivanyukite-Na (IMA2007-041) 9.0   [no]
Ivsite (IMA2013-138) 7.0  [no] [no] (IUPAC: trisodium hydrogen disulfate)
Iwakiite (IMA1974-049) 4.BB.10    (IUPAC: manganese(II) diiron(III) tetraoxide)
Iwashiroite-(Y) (IMA2003-053) 7.GA.10    (IUPAC: yttrium tetraoxotantalate)
Iwateite (aphthitalite: IMA2013-034) 8.0  [no]  (IUPAC: disodium barium manganese diphosphate)
Ixiolite (columbite: IMA1962 s.p., 1857 Rd) 4.DB.25   
Iyoite (atacamite: IMA2013-130) 3.0  [no] [no] (IUPAC: manganese copper trihydro chloride)
Izoklakeite (kobellite: IMA1983-065) 2.HB.10b   

External links
IMA Database of Mineral Properties/ RRUFF Project
Mindat.org - The Mineral Database
Webmineral.com
Mineralatlas.eu minerals I